The 1978 European Karate Championships, the 13th edition, was held  in Geneva, Switzerland from May 19 to 21, 1978.

Competition

Team

References

1978
International sports competitions hosted by Switzerland
European Karate Championships
European championships in 1978
Sports competitions in Geneva
Karate competitions in Switzerland
20th century in Geneva